Sergio Roitman and Andrés Schneiter were the defending champions but lost in the first round to Todd Perry and Paul Rosner.

František Čermák and Julian Knowle won in the final 6–4, 6–4 against Albert Portas and Fernando Vicente.

Seeds
Champion seeds are indicated in bold text while text in italics indicates the round in which those seeds were eliminated.

 Tomáš Cibulec /  Daniel Vacek (quarterfinals)
 Paul Hanley /  Michael Hill (first round)
 Petr Pála /  Pavel Vízner (semifinals)
 Simon Aspelin /  Martín García (first round)

Draw

External links
 2002 Croatia Open Doubles Draw

Croatia Open
2002 ATP Tour